Tanker "Derbent", is a 1941 Soviet adventure film directed by Aleksandr Faintsimmer based on the story of the same name by Yuri Krymov.

Plot 
The tanker Derbent is sent to rescue the crew of the tanker Agamali, on which a fire occurred.

Starring 
 Iona Biy-Brodskiy as Cargo assistant captain
 Emmanuil Geller as Zhora
 Anatoliy Goryunov as Yevgeny Vasilievich
 Tatyana Govorkova as Simochka
 Aleksandr Grechanyy as Seaman in shipping company
 Mikhail Ivanov as Photographer
 Vasili Merkuryev as Dogailo
 Gennadi Karnovich-Valua as Reporter
 Yefim Kopelyan as Helmsman
 Lidiya Sukharevskaya as Vera the barmaid
 Pyotr Kirillov as Bredis

References

External links 
 

1941 films
1940s Russian-language films
Soviet black-and-white films
Soviet adventure films
1941 adventure films
Films directed by Aleksandr Faintsimmer
Films based on Russian novels